Sophie Villeneuve (born 6 November 1969) is a French cross-country skier who competed from 1991 to 1999. Competing in three Winter Olympics, her best career finish was fifth in the 4 × 5 km relay at Albertville in 1992 while her best individual finish was ninth in the 15 km event at Lillehammer in 1994.

Villeneuve's best finish at the FIS Nordic World Ski Championships was ninth in the 15 km event at Trondheim in 1997. Her best World Cup finish was fourth in an individual sprint event in Italy in 1997.

Villeneuve's lone individual victory was in a 10 km Continental Cup event in Italy in 1992. She also competed in the women's cross-country mountain biking event at the 2000 Summer Olympics.

Cross-country skiing results
All results are sourced from the International Ski Federation (FIS).

Olympic Games

World Championships

World Cup

Season standings

Team podiums
 1 podium – (1 )

See also
 List of athletes who competed in both the Summer and Winter Olympic games

References

External links

Women's 4 x 5 km cross-country relay Olympic results: 1976-2002 

1969 births
Sportspeople from Mulhouse
Cross-country skiers at the 1992 Winter Olympics
Cross-country skiers at the 1994 Winter Olympics
Cross-country skiers at the 1998 Winter Olympics
French female cross-country skiers
Living people
Olympic cross-country skiers of France
French female cyclists
Olympic cyclists of France
Cyclists at the 2000 Summer Olympics
Cyclists from Grand Est
21st-century French women